I'm One of You is the fiftieth studio album by American musician Hank Williams Jr. This album was released on November 18, 2003 on the Curb Records label. A video has been made for the track "Why Can't We All Just Get a Long Neck?"

Track listing

Personnel

 Jimmy Bones – Hammond organ
 Kady Bopp – choir
 Bruce Bouton – lap steel guitar
 Lisa Brokop – choir
 Pat Buchanan – slide guitar
 Joe Chemay – bass guitar
 Rob Crosby – choir
 Caroline Cutbirth – choir
 Eric Darken – percussion
 Marcus Eldridge – choir
 Larry Franklin – fiddle
 Paul Franklin – pedal steel guitar
 Kristin Garner – choir
 Jimmy Hall – harmonica, saxophone
 Jennifer Hicks – choir
 Wes Hightower – background vocals
 John Hobbs – Hammond organ, keyboards
 John Barlow Jarvis – Hammond organ, piano
 Kim Keyes – background vocals
 Paul Leim – drums
 Chris Leuzinger – dobro, electric guitar
 Lauren Lucas – choir
 Ann McCrary – background vocals
 Christy McDonald – choir
 Brent Mason – electric guitar
 Chip Matthews – choir
 Joey Miskulin – accordion
 Steve Nathan – clavinet, keyboards, Hammond organ, synthesizer
 Marcia Ramirez – choir
 Jim Reilley – choir
 Brent Rowan – six-string bass guitar, 12-string electric guitar, acoustic guitar, baritone guitar, sitar, slide guitar
 Bryan Sutton – 12-string acoustic guitar, acoustic guitar
 George Tidwell – trumpet
 Hank Williams Jr. – lead vocals, background vocals
 Hilary Williams – choir
 Reggie Young – electric guitar

Chart performance

External links
 Hank Williams, Jr's Official Website
 Record Label

References

2003 albums
Hank Williams Jr. albums
Curb Records albums
Albums produced by Doug Johnson (record producer)